Fokus was a political party in Denmark. The party was founded in 2010, originally as a splinter group of the Danish People’s Party (DF), but the politics of Fokus differed from that of DF on a number of issues. For example, while DF supported Lars Løkke Rasmussen, Fokus had voiced support for Helle Thorning-Schmidt of the Social Democrats. The party was dissolved in 2015.

Representation 
The party had one member in the Danish parliament from 2010 to November 2011. It did not qualify to run in the 2011 elections. The party formerly had two members of local city councils, one in Viborg and one in Lejre. The leader of the party was the former MP Christian Hansen.

Political positions 
The main issues of Fokus were environmental and energy policy, as well as animal welfare. Fokus branded itself as “the greenest party of Denmark”. Another important issue was social welfare, and the party persistently emphasized the need for more balance everywhere in society, not least between the bigger cities and smaller communities in the countryside, an issue which has become increasingly debated in Denmark since 2010, especially with respect to health policy. Although taking a regionalist stance on many issues, Fokus wanted to close down the regions (administrative entities on the level between state and municipalities) and let the state take over responsibility for hospitals, which are currently run by these regions.

The slogan of Fokus is (in Danish) Frihed, Omsorg, Kommunikation, Udholdenhed, Samarbejde (Freedom, Care, Communication, Persistence, Cooperation).

References

External links 
 Official site 

2010 establishments in Denmark
Defunct political parties in Denmark
Political parties established in 2010
Green political parties in Denmark